is a Japanese sport shooter who competed in the 1996 Summer Olympics.

References

1968 births
Living people
Japanese male sport shooters
ISSF pistol shooters
Olympic shooters of Japan
Shooters at the 1996 Summer Olympics
Shooters at the 1998 Asian Games
Shooters at the 2006 Asian Games
Asian Games medalists in shooting
Asian Games silver medalists for Japan
Medalists at the 1998 Asian Games
Medalists at the 2006 Asian Games
20th-century Japanese people
21st-century Japanese people